Vopnafjörður is a village and municipality in Northeast Iceland, standing on a peninsula in the middle of a mountainous bay by the same name. The main industries of Vopnafjörður are fish processing, agriculture and tourism and other services.

Overview
Vopnafjörður is known for its salmon rivers and large areas of untouched landscape. Hofsá and Selá are two of the most exclusive salmon rivers in Iceland. The salmon rivers and other attractions in and around Vopnafjörður have drawn numerous foreign visitors, including artists, celebrities and politicians such as Charles, Prince of Wales, George Bush, Sr., Jack Nicklaus and Queen Paola of Belgium.

Vopnafjörður is on Route 85 and has an airport with scheduled flights to Akureyri on business days. Other services include Vopnafjarðarskóli primary school with 99 students, Leikskólinn Brekkubær preschool, Landsbankinn bank and Heilbrigðisstofnun Austurlands clinic.

HB Grandi, Iceland's largest fishing company, is the largest employer in the area. The company runs a high-tech freezing plant and a fishmeal factory in Vopnafjörður.

History
The bay of Vopnafjörður was first settled by Vikings in the late 9th century CE. The name Vopnafjörður literally means "Weapon Fjord" or "Weapon Bay", and comes from the nickname of one of the settlers, Eyvindur vopni.

Disputes between local chieftains led to a number of killings in the 10th century. The story of the disputes is told in Vopnfirðinga saga, one of the classic Sagas of Icelanders, a series of epic family histories written in the 13th century.

Little is known about the history of Vopnafjörður after Iceland lost its independence to Norway in 1264. Foreign merchants sailed to Vopnafjörður in the early modern age, and it was one of three trade ports in East Iceland in the 17th and 18th centuries.

The Danish trading company Ørum & Wulff had extensive operations in Vopnafjörður in the 19th century. A local cooperative, Kaupfélag Vopnfirðinga, was established in 1918, and was one of Vopnafjörður's largest employers throughout the 20th century, but filed for bankruptcy in 2004.

In the late 19th century, poor farmers were forced to move into the mountains above Vopnafjörður, when they could no longer afford living on densely populated land in the lowlands. For several decades, many families lived in the highlands, experiencing extreme hardship. The highland farms inspired the setting of the novel Independent People by Halldór Laxness. The book helped him win the Nobel Prize in Literature in 1955.

Modern infrastructure, including roads, harbors and bridges, was first introduced in Vopnafjörður in the early 20th century. Today, new infrastructure is of highest standards.

Emigration to America

Vopnafjörður was the largest port of Icelandic emigration to America in the late 19th and early 20th centuries. Thousands of North Americans have ancestors who lived in Vopnafjörður.

Geography

Vopnafjörður is located in Northeast Iceland. The Vopnafjörður area coastline is characterized by the Tangi  peninsula, coastal rocks, islets, coves, river mouths, and black sand beaches.

During the Ice Age (up to 10,000 years ago) a large glacier covered the bay. The Ice Age glacier carved the diverse mountains and rock formations that characterize the area. After the Ice Age, the land rose as the heavy load of the glacier fell away, and began to look as it does today.

The largest river to run into the bay is Hofsá, one of the best known salmon-fishing rivers in the country.

The village of Vopnafjörður is located on the Tangi peninsula in the middle of the bay. Surrounding farms reach far into Hofsárdalur  and Vesturárdalur  valleys, and to the northern coast of the bay.

Climate
Temperatures very rarely drop below −10 °C (14 °F) in the winter. This is because the Icelandic coastal weather in winter is moderated by the warm waters of the Gulf Stream. Summers are cool, with temperatures sometimes reaching 20 °C (68 °F). The climate has significantly warmed in recent years.

Administration

The local government is the municipality of Vopnafjarðarhreppur , which is governed by the municipal council. The council has seven members who are elected in direct elections by the residents of Vopnafjörður for four-year terms. Anyone who is 18 years or older and has his or her legal domicile registered in Vopnafjörður has the right to participate in the local elections. The last municipal elections were held in May 2010.

Demographics

On 1 January 2011, the population of Vopnafjörður was 668, of whom 529 lived in the village, and 139 in the rural part of the municipality. 350 were males and 318 females. 146 were under 18 years of age.

In 2010, the total population was 683, of whom 666 people held Icelandic citizenship. 17 were citizens of other countries, and did not hold dual Icelandic citizenship. Four of those were Danish citizens, one Finnish, three German, one Latvian, one Mexican, one Dutch, one Swiss, three Thai, one British, and one US.

The total population of Vopnafjörður was 987 in 1901, 677 in 1950, 908 in 1990, and 789 in 2000.

Sports

Einherji is Vopnafjörður's sports team. Soccer is the most popular sport, followed by Volleyball.

Main sights

Bustarfell, folk museum
Gljúfursárfoss, waterfall on Vopnafjörður's southern coast.
Highland farms, the setting that inspired Nobel Prize-winning author Halldór Laxness' novel Independent People.
Ljótsstaðir, childhood home of Gunnar Gunnarsson.

People from Vopnafjörður
, musician, playwright and radio host
, playwright and lyricist
Björgvin Guðmundsson, composer
Gunnar Gunnarsson, writer
Pálmi Gunnarsson, pop singer
Linda Pétursdóttir, businesswoman, Miss Iceland World 1988 and Miss World 1988
Sigurður Þórarinsson geologist and lyricist
Pall Thordarson (born 1971), Director of Research in the School of Chemistry, University of New South Wales
, architect
Konráð S. Guðjónsson, economist

References

External links

 

Municipalities of Iceland
Populated places in Eastern Region (Iceland)
Fjords of Iceland